Santa Rosa Mall is a shopping mall in Bayamón, Puerto Rico. It is on Puerto Rico Highway 2 and is near the Deportivo station of Tren Urbano. The mall is anchored by Burlington Coat Factory and IKEA. Burlington Coat Factory was previously Supermercados Grande, and a Gonzalez Padin.

On August 31, 2019, it was announced that Sears would be closing this location a part of a plan to close 85 stores nationwide. The store closed in December 2019. In January 2020, two months before the COVID-19 pandemic began, IKEA announced that it plans to open a store at the former Sears, which opened on September 29, 2021.

Anchor stores                              
Burlington
IKEA

Former Anchors
Sears
Gonzalez Padin -?
Supermercados Grande
Belk-Lindsey
Western Auto
Grand Union Supermarkets

References

External links
Official website

Shopping malls in Puerto Rico
Shopping malls established in 1964
Buildings and structures in Bayamón, Puerto Rico
1964 establishments in Puerto Rico